Cheshire Township is one of the fifteen townships of Gallia County, Ohio, United States. As of the 2010 census the population was 1,002, down from 1,259 at the 2000 census. In 2010, 132 residents lived in the village of Cheshire within the township, while 870 lived in the unincorporated portion of the township.

Geography
Located in the northeastern corner of the county along the Ohio River, it borders the following townships:
Rutland Township, Meigs County - north
Salisbury Township, Meigs County - northeast
Addison Township - south
Springfield Township - southwest corner
Morgan Township - west
Salem Township, Meigs County - northwest corner

Mason County, West Virginia, lies across the Ohio River to the southeast.

The farthest upstream Ohio River township in the county, it includes Gallia County's farthest east point.

The village of Cheshire is located in southeastern Cheshire Township.

Name and history
It is the only Cheshire Township statewide.

Government
The township is governed by a three-member board of trustees, who are elected in November of odd-numbered years to a four-year term beginning on the following January 1. Two are elected in the year after the presidential election and one is elected in the year before it. There is also an elected township fiscal officer, who serves a four-year term beginning on April 1 of the year after the election, which is held in November of the year before the presidential election. Vacancies in the fiscal officership or on the board of trustees are filled by the remaining trustees.

References

External links
County website

Townships in Gallia County, Ohio
Townships in Ohio